David John Procter is a British chemist and a Professor in the Department of Chemistry at The University of Manchester. His research is based on organic chemistry and catalysis, specifically on radical cascades, sulfonium cross-coupling and copper catalysis.

Education 
Procter completed his Bsc in 1992 at University of Leeds. Upon graduation, he continued to read for his Doctor of Philosophy degree with Prof. Christopher Rayner on The development of a selenoxide-based asymmetric oxidation of sulfides to sulfoxides and successfully gained his PhD in 1995.

Research and career 
Procter completed his postdoctoral research with Prof. Robert Holton at Florida State University in Tallahassee, United States before moving to the University of Glasgow in 1997 as a Lecturer. In February 2004, he was promoted to the Senior Lecturer position and in September in the same year, was promoted to Reader in the Department of Chemistry at the University of Manchester. He was promoted to Professor in October 2008.

Procter's research is generally on organic synthesis and catalysis chemistry and is specifically based on Radical cascades, Sulfonium cross-coupling and copper catalysis.

Apart from research and lecturing, Procter has an established career fellowship (2015 - 2020) at the Engineering and Physical Sciences Research Council and an author profile in Angewandte Chemie. Procter was also a Leverhulme Trust Research Fellow (2013 - 2014) and is the lead author of Organic Synthesis using Samarium Diiodide: A practical guide. He was the Engineering and Physical Sciences Research Council panel chair in March 2017, January 2013 and September 2011 and was the Head of Organic Chemistry in the Department of Chemistry at the University of Manchester from 2011 to 2014.

Notable work 

Prof. Procter has carried out a wide variety of research on the efficient construction of organic molecules. In 2015, he led a research on the synthesis of novel tri-cyclic organic compounds inspired by the antibacterial, pleuromutilin via SmII-mediated radical cyclization cascades of dialdehydes, prepared by a one-pot, copper catalyzed double organomagnesium addition to β‐chlorocyclohexenone. This was the first time that important analogues of the antibacterial was prepared, which previously was unable to be synthesized using the naturally occurring product.

Prof. Procter has also invented metal-free coupling processes that may has decrease(d) the reliance of expensive and supply-risk transition metals. Examples include metal-free alkylation and arylation of benzothiophenes, metal-free synthesis of benzothiophenes by twofold C–H functionalization, and new reagents for metal-free C–H trifluoromethylthiolation in Trifluoromethyl sulfoxides.

Awards and nominations 

 Young Heterocyclic Chemist Award (2015)
 Bader Award (2014)
 Liebig Lectureship (2014)

Major reviews and publications

Major Research Publications by Prof. David J. Procter (2015–present):

References

External links
  at University of Manchester

Living people
British chemists
Academics of the University of Manchester
21st-century chemists
Alumni of the University of Leeds
Place of birth missing (living people)
1970s births